Michael Hansmeyer is a post-modern architect who utilizes algorithmic architecture techniques, generative art mentalities, and CAD software to generate complex structures. He is currently based in the CAAD group at ETH's architecture department in Zurich. He holds an MBA degree from INSEAD as well as a Master of Architecture degree from Columbia University. He previously worked with McKinsey & Company, J.P. Morgan, and at Herzog & de Meuron architects.

Architectural design projects 
"Subdivided Columns – A New Order (2010)"
Columns of incredible complexity and symmetry, the prototypes are made from a steel core with a facade of ABS plastic so that they can be used in an outdoors setting and are load bearing. “[The columns] are an attempt to incorporate tools and technologies that can expand the scope of what is possible and what is imaginable and in the best case to create something that is not yet imaginable,” says Michael Hansmeyer in a 2011 article.

"Voxel-based Geometries (2009)"
"['Voxel-based Geometries'] simulates chemical interactions between substances contained in the voxels. This process has been associated with pattern formation not only on a number of organisms, but also in the fields of geology and ecology."

"Platonic Solids (2008)"
"The Platonic Solids project explores how a purely operations-based geometric process can generate complex form."

"Subdivided Pavilions (2006)"
"The aim of this project is to use a very simple process to generate heterogenous, complex output. A simple process has the advantage of more control; its output is easier to predict and can therefore be more easily refined through subsequent parameter adjustments."

"L-Systems in Architecture (2003)"
L-Systems in architecture applies Lindenmayer's L-system to mimic organic growth which is then adapted to architectural design requirements.

References

External links
 
 

21st-century architects
Columbia Graduate School of Architecture, Planning and Preservation alumni
Living people
Year of birth missing (living people)